Bernard Hurley (born 1948) is an Irish retired hurler who played as a goalkeeper for the Cork senior team.

Born in Blackrock, Cork, Hurley first arrived on the inter-county scene at the age of seventeen when he first linked up with the Cork minor team, before later joining the Cork under-21 team. He joined the extended senior panel during the 1970 championship.

At club level Hurley is a one-time All-Ireland medallist with Blackrock. In addition to this he has also won one Munster medal and one championship medal.

Honours

Team

Blackrock
All-Ireland (1): 1972
Munster Senior Club Hurling Championship (1): 1971
Cork Senior Club Hurling Championship (1): 1971

Cork
All-Ireland Under-21 Hurling Championship (2): 1968, 1969
Munster Under-21 Hurling Championship (2): 1968, 1969
All-Ireland Minor Hurling Championship (1): 1966
Munster Minor Hurling Championship (1): 1966

References

1948 births
Living people
Blackrock National Hurling Club hurlers
Cork inter-county hurlers
Hurling goalkeepers